tert-Amyl chloride (2-methyl-2-butyl chloride) is an alkyl chloride used for flavoring and odorizing. At room temperature, it is a colorless liquid with an unpleasant odor. It can be synthesized from tert-amyl alcohol by an SN1 reaction.

See also
 1-Chloropentane

References

Chloroalkanes